Lancun Township is a township under the administration of Xinfu District, Xinzhou, Shanxi, China. , it administers the following 20 villages:
Lancun Village
Mopanshan Village
Yancun Village
Dawang Village
Xiaowang Village
Nanhuyan Village
Xiqu Village
Beichang Village
Xiashe Village
Fanye Village
Zhangye Village
Yancun Village
Hexitou Village
Wangyao Village
Yidi Village
Qiantanggou Village
Xiwang Village
Xiaojiayu Village
Nanbao Village
Houyeyu Village

See also 
 List of township-level divisions of Shanxi

References 

Township-level divisions of Shanxi
Xinzhou